Lower Allithwaite is a civil parish in the South Lakeland district of the English county of Cumbria.  It includes the villages of Allithwaite and Cartmel, the historic Cartmel Priory, Humphrey Head and Cartmel Racecourse. In the 2001 census the parish had a population of 1,758, increasing at the 2011 census to 1,831.

See also

Listed buildings in Lower Allithwaite

References

External links
  Cumbria County History Trust: Allithwaite, Lower (nb: provisional research only - see Talk page)

Civil parishes in Cumbria